Simon Ko or Ko Shen-yeaw is a Taiwanese politician, who is currently the Taiwanese Representative to Spain. He previously served as the Deputy Foreign Minister of the Republic of China from September 2012 to January 2016.

Education
Ko obtained his bachelor's and master's degrees in diplomacy and public administration from National Chengchi University in 1975 and 1978, respectively. He studied Spanish at the Spanish Language School in San José, Costa Rica from 1979 to 1981.

ROC Foreign Affairs Deputy Ministry

ROC-Honduras diplomatic relations
In early July 2013, Ko said that his recent trip to Honduras is just another normal regular trip to one of ROC allies, which includes inspecting ROC embassy in that country, dismissing that Honduras might switch diplomatic relations from ROC to PRC due to the reluctance of ROC in giving extra grant to the country. However, Ko added that the ROC Ministry of Foreign Affairs will not mind for Honduras to have "unofficial" non-political relation with the PRC as long as the move doesn't affect the diplomatic relation with ROC.

Gambia diplomatic relation switch from ROC to PRC
Commenting on the decision made by Gambia to switch diplomatic relations from ROC to PRC on 14 November 2013, Ko said that the ROC government felt shock and regret at the move, in which it made ROC being recognized by only 22 countries around the world, in which most of them are developing nations. The move came in despite recent visit by President Ma Ying-jeou to the resource-poor nation in 2012 and also the USD 22 million fund donated to the nation for the construction of of road linking the western part of the country to the capital Banjul.

See also
 Ministry of Foreign Affairs (Republic of China)

References

Living people
Ambassadors of the Republic of China
Ambassadors of the Republic of China to Panama
Representatives of Taiwan to Spain
Taiwanese Ministers of Foreign Affairs
Year of birth missing (living people)